Michael Laban Walzer (born March 3, 1935) is an American political theorist and public intellectual. A professor emeritus at the Institute for Advanced Study (IAS) in Princeton, New Jersey, he is editor emeritus of Dissent, an intellectual magazine that he has been affiliated with since his years as an undergraduate at Brandeis University.  He has written books and essays on a wide range of topics—many in political ethics—including just and unjust wars, nationalism, ethnicity, Zionism, economic justice, social criticism, radicalism, tolerance, and political obligation. He is also a contributing editor to The New Republic.  To date, he has written 27 books and published over 300 articles, essays, and book reviews in Dissent, The New Republic, The New York Review of Books, The New Yorker, The New York Times, Harpers, and many philosophical and political science journals.

Early life and education
Born to a Jewish family on March 3, 1935, Walzer graduated summa cum laude from Brandeis University in 1956 with a Bachelor of Arts degree in history.  He then studied at the University of Cambridge on a Fulbright Fellowship (1956–1957) and completed his doctoral work at Harvard University, earning his Doctor of Philosophy degree in government under Samuel Beer in 1961.

Work
Walzer is usually identified as one of the leading proponents of the communitarian position in political theory, along with Alasdair MacIntyre and Michael J. Sandel. Like Sandel and MacIntyre, Walzer is not completely comfortable with this label. However, he has long argued that political theory must be grounded in the traditions and culture of particular societies, and has long opposed what he sees to be the excessive abstraction of political philosophy. His most important intellectual contributions include Just and Unjust Wars (1977), a revitalization of just war theory that insists on the importance of "ethics" in wartime while eschewing pacifism; the theory of "complex equality", which holds that the metric of just equality is not some single material or moral good, but rather that egalitarian justice demands that each good be distributed according to its social meaning, and that no good (like money or political power) be allowed to dominate or distort the distribution of goods in other spheres; and an argument that justice is primarily a moral standard within particular nations and societies, not one that can be developed in a universalized abstraction.

In On Toleration, he describes various examples of (and approaches to) toleration in various settings, including multinational empires such as Rome; nations in past and current-day international society; "consociations" such as Switzerland; nation-states such as France; and immigrant societies such as the United States. He concludes by describing a "post-modern" view, in which cultures within an immigrant nation have blended and inter-married to the extent that toleration becomes an intra-familial affair.

Employment
Walzer was first employed in 1962 in the politics department at Princeton University. He stayed there until 1966, when he moved to the government department at Harvard. He taught at Harvard until 1980, when he became a permanent faculty member in the School of Social Science at the Institute for Advanced Study.

In 1971, Walzer taught a semester-long course at Harvard with Robert Nozick called "Capitalism and Socialism". The course was a debate between the two philosophers: Nozick's side is delineated in Anarchy, State, and Utopia (1974), and Walzer's side is expressed in his Spheres of Justice (1983), in which he argues for "complex equality".

Walzer is a member of the editorial board of the Jewish Review of Books and an Advisory Editor at Fathom.

Awards and honors
In April 2008, Walzer received the prestigious Spinoza Lens, a bi-annual prize for ethics in the Netherlands. He has also been honoured with an emeritus professorship at the prestigious Institute for Advanced Study. He was elected to a Fellowship of the American Academy of Arts & Sciences in 1971, a member of the American Philosophical Society in 1990, and to a Corresponding Fellowship of the British Academy in 2016.

Personal life
Walzer is married to Judith Borodovko Walzer. They are parents of two daughters: Sarah Esther Walzer (born 1961) and Rebecca Leah Walzer (born 1966). His grandchildren are Joseph and Katya Barrett and Jules and Stefan Walzer-Goldfeld.

Walzer is the older brother of historian Judith Walzer Leavitt.

Books
 The Revolution of the Saints: A Study in the Origins of Radical Politics (Harvard University Press, 1965) 
 Obligations: Essays on Disobedience, War and Citizenship (Harvard University Press, 1970) 
 Political Action (Quadrangle Books, 1971) 
 Regicide and Revolution (Cambridge University Press, 1974) 
 Just and Unjust Wars (Basic Books, 1977; second edition, 1992; third edition, 2000, ; fourth edition, 2006); fifth edition, 2015.
 Radical Principles (Basic Books, 1977) 
 Spheres of Justice (Basic Books, 1983) 
 Exodus and Revolution (Basic Books, 1985) 
 Interpretation and Social Criticism (Harvard University Press, 1987) 
 The Company of Critics (Basic Books, 1988) 
 Zivile Gesellschaft und amerikanische Demokratie (Rotbuch Verlag, 1992)  (collection of essays in German collection; the title translates as "Civil Society and American Democracy")
 What It Means to Be an American (Marsilio Publishers, 1992) 
 Thick and Thin: Moral Argument at Home and Abroad (Notre Dame Press, 1994) 
 Pluralism, Justice and Equality, with David Miller (Oxford University Press, 1995) 
 Toward a Global Civil Society (Berghahn Books, 1995) 
 On Toleration (Yale University Press, 1997) 
 Arguments from the Left (Atlas, 1997, in Swedish)
 Pluralism and Democracy (Editions Esprit, 1997, in French) 
 Reason, Politics, and Passion (Fischer Taschenbuch Verlag, 1999, in German) 
 The Jewish Political Tradition, Vol. I: Authority. co-edited with Menachem Lorberbaum, Noam Zohar, and Yair Lorberbaum (Yale University Press, 2000) 
 Exilic Politics in the Hebrew Bible (Mohr Siebeck, 2001, in German) 
 War, Politics, and Morality (Ediciones Paidos (es), 2001, in Spanish) 
 The Jewish Political Tradition, Vol. II: Membership. co-edited with Menachem Lorberbaum, Noam Zohar, and Yair Lorberbaum (Yale University Press, 2003) 
 Arguing About War (Yale University Press, 2004) 
 Politics and Passion: Toward A More Egalitarian Liberalism (Yale University Press, 2004) 
 Law, Politics, and Morality in Judaism. edited by Walzer (Princeton University Press, 2006) 
 Thinking Politically (Yale University Press, 2007) 
 In God's Shadow: Politics in the Hebrew Bible (Yale University Press, 2012)  
 The Paradox of Liberation (Yale University Press, 2015) 
 A Foreign Policy for the Left (Yale University Press, 2018)

See also
 Hugo Grotius
 Emer de Vattel
 Thomas Nagel
 Richard Rorty
 John Rawls

Notes

References

External links

 Dissent Quarterly magazine of politics and culture edited by Michael Walzer
 Walzer's biography at the Institute for Advanced Study
 "Arguing about War" Review of Walzer's Arguing about War in n+1 magazine
 The Argument about Humanitarian Intervention By Michael Walzer
 Micha Odenheimer, A “Connected Critic”, Micha Odenheimer speaks with an individual who has carved out a space for himself as a left-wing supporter of Israel, Eretz Acheret Magazine
 Review of Thinking Politically, Barcelona Metropolis, 2010.
 A Conversation with Michael Walzer Video interview, 2012.
 
 For an analysis of communitarianism see: Gad Barzilai, Communities and Law: Politics and Cultures of Legal Identities (Ann Arbor: University of Michigan Press, 2003)
 The Future of Liberal Zionism: An interview with Michael Walzer, 20 September 2012
 The Jewish Political Tradition, 26 April 2013
 Perry Anderson's House of Zion: A symposium - Fathom Journal
 Interview with Dr. Michael Walzer  by Stephen McKiernan, Binghamton University Libraries Center for the Study of the 1960s, April 4, 2016

1935 births
20th-century American philosophers
21st-century American philosophers
Alumni of the University of Cambridge
20th-century American Jews
American political philosophers
Brandeis University alumni
Harvard Graduate School of Arts and Sciences alumni
Institute for Advanced Study faculty
Jewish philosophers
Living people
The New Republic people
American Zionists
Philosophers of war
Corresponding Fellows of the British Academy
21st-century American Jews